Hoot Kloot is an American series of 17 theatrical cartoon shorts produced by DePatie–Freleng Enterprises from 1973 to 1974.

Plot 
Sheriff Hoot Kloot is a diminutive, short-tempered lawman who tries to maintain order in a remote western town. He is aided by his loyal horse Fester whom Kloot refers to simply as "Horse". Fester remains Kloot's honest and faithful friend, often giving the Sheriff the benefit of his homespun wisdom while battling various outlaws including Crazywolf, a looney sheep-stealing wolf.

Hoot Kloot was later broadcast as part of the NBC Saturday morning cartoon series The Pink Panther and Friends.

Filmography 
All cartoons written by John W. Dunn.

Credits 
 Produced by: David H. DePatie and Friz Freleng
 Story: John W. Dunn
 Animation: Bob Bemiller, John Freeman, Bob Richardson, Reuben Timmins, Don Williams
 Title Designer: Arthur Leonardi
 Layout: Martin Strudler
 Background: Richard Thomas
 Voices:
 Hoot Kloot/Fester - Bob Holt
 Crazywolf - Larry D. Mann
 Camera: John Burton Jr.
 Executive in Charge of Production: Lee Gunther
 Film Editor: Joe Siracusa
 Musical Director: Doug Goodwin
 Musicians:
 Larry Ketchum - piano
 Harold Wass - violin
 Scott Jordan - guitar
 Polly Henry - flute
 Angela Shea - saxophone
 Tom Sebastian - bass

Home video 
Kino Lorber (through their deal with MGM Home Entertainment) released all 17 shorts on DVD and Blu-ray in May 2017.

References

External links 
 Hoot Kloot at Don Markstein's Toonopedia. Archived from the original on April 13, 2012.
 Big Cartoon Database
 TV.com
 Toonarific

Film series introduced in 1973
Animated film series
DePatie–Freleng Enterprises
Television series by MGM Television
The Pink Panther Show
Fictional sheriffs